Arulmigu Meenakshi Amman College of Engineering (AMACE) is an engineering college in Vadamavandal near Kancheepuram, India. Established in 1985, this college is managed by Meenakshi Ammal Trust.

Arulmigu Meenakshi Amman College of Engineering is an institution that has been approved by All India Council of Technical Education (AICTE), New Delhi, and is affiliated to Anna University, South India. The college was established in 1985 by an order of the government of Tamil Nadu as a Telugu Linguistic Minority Engineering College, approved by AICTE and affiliated to University of Madras. Now it is affiliated with Anna University in Chennai.

Features 
 Laboratories, library and sports facilities.
 College transport and government buses from Kancheepuram, Cheyyar, Vandhavasi, Ranipet and Arcot.
 Separate hostel facility for boys and girls on the campus.

Undergraduate courses
 B.E. Civil Engineering
 B.E. Computer Science & Engineering
 B.E. Electrical and Electronics Engineering
 B.E. Electronics & Communication Engineering
 B.E. Mechanical Engineering
 B.E. Instrumentation and Control Engineering
 B.Tech. Information Technology
 B.Tech. Chemical Engineering
 B.Tech. Bio-Technology
 B.Architecture (five years)

Postgraduate courses
 M.E Applied Electronics
 M.E Computer Science & Engineering
 M.E Power Systems
 M.E Structural Engineering
 Master of Computer Applications
 Master of Business Administration (full time)
 Master of Business Administration (part time)

Departments 
 Architecture
 Bio Technology
 Chemical Engineering
 Civil Engineering
 Computer Science & Engineering
 Electrical and Electronics Engineering
 Electronics and Communication Engineering
 Mechanical Engineering
 Information Technology
 Master of Computer Applications
 Management Studies

References

External links 
 Arulmigu Meenakshi Amman College of Engineering

Engineering colleges in Tamil Nadu
Colleges affiliated to Anna University
Educational institutions established in 1985
1985 establishments in Tamil Nadu
Kanchipuram